Psalistopoides is a genus of spiders in the family Nemesiidae. It was first described in 1934 by Mello-Leitão. , it contains 2 species from Brazil.

References

Nemesiidae
Mygalomorphae genera
Spiders of Brazil